A Toponymic surname.

In his reference work The Surnames of Scotland, George F. Black shows the surnames Middlemas, Middlemass and Middlemiss as one and to these can be added Midlemas and Middlemist from A Dictionary of English Surnames by P. H. Reaney (subsequently revised by M. A. Wilson) which acknowledges the Scottish source also. 

The surname is attributed to an area around Kelso, Roxburghshire in the Eastern Borders of Scotland and specifically a place Middlemestlands.

Variations recorded by Black

Black uses only three versions of the surname in his dictionary but lists many more from his researches into the recording of them. The following are these historical variations.

Middlemas 
Notable people with this surname include:

Keith Middlemas (1935–2013), English historian
Jack Middlemas (1896–1984), English footballer
Rich Middlemas, documentary film maker

Middlemass 
Notable people with this surname include:

 Clive Middlemass (born 1944), English football player and manager
 Frank Middlemass (1919-2006), English actor
 Jimmy Middlemass (1920-1998), Scottish football player (Kilmarnock FC)

Middlemast 
Notable people with this surname include:
 E. W. Middlemast (born 1864), British mathematician and educator

Middlemiss 
Notable people with this surname include:

 Bert Middlemiss (1888–1941) was a professional footballer
 Charles Stewart Middlemiss (1859–1945), British geologist
 Elinor Middlemiss (born 1967), Scottish badminton player
 Glen Middlemiss (born 1956), Australian rules footballer
 Jayne Middlemiss (born 1971), English television and radio presenter
 Kenny Middlemiss (born 1964), Scottish badminton player
 Philip Middlemiss (born 1963), British television and radio actor
 Robert Middlemiss (1935-2010), Canadian politician
 Russell Middlemiss (born 1929), former Australian rules footballer

See also 

 Michaelmas